Yavaş is a surname, having a few meanings like slow or gradual in the Persian and turkish languages. Notable people with the surname include:

 Genç Osman Yavaş (born 1971), Turkish singer
 Lale Yavaş (born 1978), Swiss actress of Turkish origin
 Serhan Yavaş (born 1972), Turkish actor and model
 Mansur Yavaş (born 1955), Turkish politician (current Mayor of Ankara)

Turkish-language surnames